The AN/FPS-8 Radar was a Medium-Range Search Radar used by the United States Air Force Air Defense Command.

The radar was a medium power D-Band search radar designed for aircraft control and early warning, and was installed at commercial airports and military bases both in the United States and overseas.
In most installations the antenna was exposed, being mounted on a temporary tower. 

For severe environmental conditions, the AN/FPS-8 was self-contained in an arctic tower with a protective radome. Over the years improvements were made to the basic AN/FPS-8, culminating in the final version whose nomenclature was AN/FPS-88 (V). The AN/FPS-8 also had  two mobile versions: the AN/MPS-11 and the AN/MPS-11A.

References

 AN/FPS-8 @ radomes.org
 Winkler, David F. (1997), Searching the skies: the legacy of the United States Cold War defense radar program. Prepared for United States Air Force Headquarters Air Combat Command.

Ground radars
Radars of the United States Air Force
MPS11
General Electric radars
Military equipment introduced in the 1950s